Atelopus reticulatus is a species of toads in the family Bufonidae.

It is endemic to Peru.
Its natural habitats are subtropical or tropical moist montane forests and rivers.
It is threatened by habitat loss.

Sources

reticulatus
Amphibians of Peru
Amphibians described in 2002
Taxonomy articles created by Polbot